Vladimir Ivanovich Korolyov (born 1 February 1955) is a Russian Admiral. He is the former commander in chief of the Russian Navy.

Biography

Korolyov graduated from the Frunze Higher Naval School in 1977. He attended the senior special officer program at the N. G. Kuznetsov Naval Academy in 1987. Korolyov served in submarines initially as navigating officer on the K467 (1977–81) and then as deputy commander of K495 (1981–84), commander of K-488 submarine (1987–88), commander of K-387 submarine (1988–93) and deputy commander of the 24th submarine division (December 1993 – April 1996). He worked at the anti-submarine division of the Northern Fleet (1996–2000) and was base commander at Gadzhievo naval base in 2002. He was subsequently chief of staff (September 2002 – August 2005) and then commanded the submarines of the 12th squadron of the Northern fleet (August 2005 – November 2007).

In 2007, Korolyov was appointed deputy commander of the Northern Fleet and in 2008, he commanded a squadron of ships including the battlecruiser Pyotr Velikiy and the Udaloy-class destroyer Admiral Chabanenko which participated in exercises in the Caribbean Sea visiting Cuba, Venezuela and Panama. Korolyov was appointed chief of staff and deputy commander of the Northern Fleet in 2009. In 2010 he became commander of the Black Sea Fleet and in 2011 he was appointed commander of the Northern Fleet.

In 2014, Korolyov was appointed commander of the Northern Fleet Joint Strategic Command to defend Russian arctic interests. Korolyov was appointed as acting commander of the Russian Navy when his predecessor, Viktor Chirkov had to take sick leave. Korolyov became commander of the Russian Navy in April 2016.

Korolyov retired from his post on 3 May 2019 and was replaced as Commander in Chief of the Navy by Nikolai Yevmenov

Awards
Order "For Merit to the Fatherland" - 2009
Order of Military Merit (Russia) - 1996
Order of Naval Merit (Russia) - 2014
Order "For Service to the Homeland in the Armed Forces of the USSR" - 3rd class - 1989

References

  - Biography in Russian

1955 births
Russian admirals
Commanders-in-chief of the Russian Navy
Recipients of the Order of Military Merit (Russia)
Living people
Recipients of the Order of Naval Merit (Russia)
N. G. Kuznetsov Naval Academy alumni